First Snow is a Canadian short drama film, directed by Michaël Lalancette and released in 2012. The film centres on a family of adult siblings whose father is in desperate need of a kidney transplant, and who are wrestling with the difficult decision of which one of them will be the donor.

The cast includes François Bernier, David Boutin, Karine Gonthier-Hyndman, Benoît Gouin, Louise Latraverse, Marie-Laurence Moreau and Noémie Yelle.

The film was a Canadian Screen Award nominee for Best Live Action Short Drama at the 1st Canadian Screen Awards.

References

External links
 

2012 short films
2012 films
Quebec films
French-language Canadian films
Canadian drama short films
2010s Canadian films